Alexander Gillan Wedderspoon (3 April 1931 – 10 June 2014) was an Anglican priest, academic, and British Army officer. He was Dean of Guildford from 1987 to 2001.

Early life
Wedderspoon was born on 3 April 1931 in Glasgow, Scotland. His father was a Church of Scotland minister. He was educated at Westminster School, then an all-boys public school in London. After his military service, he went on to study at Jesus College, Oxford.

Career

Military service
Wedderspoon undertook National Service as a commissioned officer in the British Army. He was commissioned on 1 April 1950 as a second lieutenant in the Royal Regiment of Artillery. On 16 December 1951, he was granted the acting rank of lieutenant. He relinquished his commission, therefore ending his liability for call up, on 1 February 1962.

Religious life
Wedderspoon was ordained in 1961. He was then a curate in Kingston upon Thames, a lecturer in religious education at the University of London, priest in charge of St Margaret's, Westminster and then a canon residentiary at Winchester Cathedral before his appointment at Guildford Cathedral, a position he held for 14 years.

Later life
He died on 10 June 2014.

Notes

External links 
 The Very Rev Alexander Wedderspoon - obituary. In: The Daily Telegraph, 26 June 2014

1931 births
2014 deaths
People educated at Westminster School, London
Alumni of Jesus College, Oxford
Royal Artillery officers
Academics of the University of London
Deans of Guildford